Tsing Shan Tsuen is an MTR Light Rail stop. It is located at ground level at the junction of Tsing Wun Road and Yip Wong Road, east of Tsing Shan Tsuen and west of Nan Fung Industrial City, in Tuen Mun District. It began service on 18 September 1988 and belongs to fare zone 2. It serves Tsing Shan Tsuen, Tuen Mun Kau Hui, and nearby industrial areas.

References

MTR Light Rail stops
Former Kowloon–Canton Railway stations
Tuen Mun District
Railway stations in Hong Kong opened in 1988
MTR Light Rail stops named from housing estates